Kaduo (Khatu) is a Southern Loloish language spoken in Mojiang, Jiangcheng, Ning'er, Zhenyuan, and Xinping counties of Yunnan, China by about 20,000 people.

 covered the Kaduo dialect of Shilong Village (石龙村), Mengnong Ethnic Yi Township (孟弄彝族乡), Mojiang County (墨江县).

Distribution
In Xinping County, Yunnan, Kaduo is spoken in the following locations.
Wajiao Village, Jianxing Township 建兴乡挖窖村
Jianxing Village, Jianxing Township 建兴乡建兴村
Wasi Village, Pingzhang Township 平掌乡瓦寺村
Baizhi Village, Pingzhang Township 平掌乡柏枝村
Shengli Village, Mosha Township 漠沙乡胜利村

References

Further reading

 
 
  (Kaduo people of Laomiaozhai 老缪寨, Pingzhang Township 平掌乡, Xinping County)

Southern Loloish languages
Languages of China